The Sumbwa are a Bantu group native to Bukombe District, Geita Region in central Tanzania.  In 1987 the Sumbwa population was estimated to number 191,000 .sumbwa is a tribe that has had its own traditions and good practices some of their traditional dances are mulekule    

their main activities were    

hunting

honey harvesting

agriculture and animal husbandry and poultry and the tribe whose alcohol they loved the most

some greetings are

Mwadila-

Mwalala-

tyani-vipi

References
 Kahigi, Kulikoyela K. (2008). Sisumbwa: Kamusi ya Kisumbwa-Kiingereza-Kiswahili na Kiingereza-Kisumbwa-Kiswahili / Sumbwa-English-Swahili and English-Sumbwa-Swahili Dictionary. .

Ethnic groups in Tanzania
Indigenous peoples of East Africa

Paul Anthony mtasima degree holder in logistics           and transport management  proves